Aygir (Ayğır) is a rural locality (a village) in Inzersky Selsoviet, Beloretsky District, Bashkortostan, Russia. The population was 12 as of 2010. There is 1 street.

Geography 
Aygir is located 97 km northwest of Beloretsk (the district's administrative centre) by road. Nizhnyaya Manyava is the nearest rural locality.

References 

Rural localities in Beloretsky District